Åsgård may refer to:

Åsskard, a village in Surnadal Municipality, Norway, known as Åsgård in Dano-Norwegian
Åsskard (municipality), a former municipality in Norway, including the village
Reidar Åsgård (born 1943), Norwegian politician

See also
Asgard (disambiguation)